Archery is a Southeast Asian Games event and has been one of the sports held at the Games since the 1977 edition in Kuala Lumpur.

Summary

Competition
From 1977 to 1987, archery awarded a total of 12 gold medals, with each distance awarded an individual medal together with the overall individual and team award. The competition was based on the Single FITA round.

From 1979 to 1991, the Double FITA format was used.

From 1989, the gold medals awarded were reduced to 4, with one each for men's individual, men's team, women's individual and women's team event.

From 2005, the compound archery event was introduced, increasing the number of medals to 8.

From 2011, the mixed team event was introduced.

The current format of individual elimination rounds only allows the top two archers from each nation to enter. Therefore, for example, if three archers from the same nation top the rankings from 1 to 3, only archers 1 and 2 are allowed to enter the knockout rounds.

Medal summary

Men's event

Recurve

Individual recurve

Individual recurve 30m

Individual recurve 50m

Individual recurve 70m

Individual recurve 90m

Team recurve

Compound

Individual compound

Team compound

Women's event

Recurve

Individual recurve

Individual recurve 30m

Individual recurve 50m

Individual recurve 60m

Individual recurve 70m

Team recurve

Compound

Individual compound

Team compound

Mixed event

Team recurve

Team compound

References